Statistics of the 1997–98 Saudi Premier League.

Stadia and locations

Final League table

Playoffs

Semifinals

Third place match

Final

External links 
 RSSSF Stats
 Saudi Arabia Football Federation
 Saudi League Statistics
 goalzz

Saudi Premier League seasons
Saudi Professional League
Professional League